Kristijan Jakić (born 14 May 1997) is a Croatian professional footballer who plays as a defensive midfielder for Bundesliga club Eintracht Frankfurt and the Croatia national team.

Career

Early career and RNK Split 
A native of Runovići, he started training at the age of 7, at the local Mračaj. Subsequently, he moved to the nearby, bigger Imotski, where he would spend four seasons, qualifying for the Croatian Academy Football League in 2013. He moved, however, to the RNK Split academy that summer. In 2015, he debuted for the Croatia U19 team, and the following and in December of the same year, for the RNK Split senior team, in a 1–1 home draw with Osijek, coming in the 66th minute for Miloš Vidović.

Istra 1961 and Lokomotiva 
In the May 2017, following the relegation of RNK Split, Jakić moved to Lokomotiva. Struggling during his first half-season at the club, Jakić requested a loan to Istra 1961 from club's director of football Božidar Šikić. He spent the second half of the 2017–18 season in Pula, where he regained form thanks to Istra coach Darko Raić-Sudar. He returned to Lokomotiva at the end of the season, where he turned into one of the best players during coach Goran Tomić's tenure at the club.

Dinamo Zagreb 
His good performances for Lokomotiva drew attention from Croatian giants Dinamo Zagreb, who signed him for €1.2 million on 24 July 2020. He was forced to miss the beginning of the season due to COVID-19 infection. He made his Dinamo debut on 12 September in a 2–1 victory over Hajduk Split. In his Europa League debut, in a goalless draw with Feyenoord on 22 October, he fouled Mark Diemers and caused a penalty, which Dinamo goalkeeper Dominik Livaković saved. On 8 November, scored his first goal for Dinamo in a 5–0 routing of Istra 1961. By the end of the first half-season, Jakić had already established himself as the important part of Dinamo's starting lineup.

On 20 July 2021, in Dinamo's Champions League second qualifying round against Omonia, Jakić assisted Lovro Majer and scored himself as Dinamo won 2–0. Ahead of Dinamo's Champions League play-off against Sheriff Tiraspol on 25 August, Jakić was dropped from the squad, with coach Damir Krznar claiming he had injured his ankle in the 1–0 league victory over Lokomotiva the weekend before. However, Sportske novosti published that Jakić was removed from the squad as a disciplinary measure after he was dissatisfied by the club refusing Eintracht Frankfurt's offer to buy him. He was unexpectedly named in the starting lineup in the 29 August league derby against Osijek, and scored the opener as Dinamo won 2–0.

Eintracht Frankfurt 
On 30 August 2021, Jakić officially signed a loan deal with Bundesliga club Eintracht Frankfurt, with an option to buy at the end of the season. He made his debut on 12 September in a 1–1 draw with VfB Stuttgart, coming off the bench for Ajdin Hrustić. He scored his first goal for Eintracht on 12 December in a 5–2 victory over Bayer Leverkusen. Despite club's underwhelming performance in Bundesliga where they finished eleventh, Jakić helped the club reach the Europa League final unbeaten, eliminating Barcelona in the process, where they defeated Rangers 5–4 on penalties.

On 29 May 2022, the transfer was made permanent and Jakić signed a four-year contract with Eintracht.

International career 
Jakić earned his first call-up to the Croatia national team on 20 September 2021, when coach Zlatko Dalić called him up for the October World Cup qualifiers against Cyprus and Slovakia. He made his debut on 8 October against the former opponent, getting substituted on in the 84th minute of the 3–0 victory.

Career statistics

Club

International

Honours
Dinamo Zagreb
 Prva HNL: 2020–21 
Croatian Cup: 2020–21

Eintracht Frankfurt
 UEFA Europa League: 2021–22
Croatia

 FIFA World Cup third place: 2022

References

External links
 
 
 

1997 births
Living people
Footballers from Split, Croatia
Croatian footballers
Association football midfielders
Croatia youth international footballers
Croatia international footballers
RNK Split players
NK Lokomotiva Zagreb players
NK Istra 1961 players
GNK Dinamo Zagreb players
Eintracht Frankfurt players
Croatian Football League players
Bundesliga players
2022 FIFA World Cup players
Croatian expatriate footballers
Croatian expatriate sportspeople in Germany
Expatriate footballers in Germany
UEFA Europa League winning players